The Braves are a Major League Baseball team that was originally based in Boston.  They moved to Milwaukee in 1953 before moving to their current home, Atlanta in 1966.  They played in the National League since its formation in 1876.  At various points in the history in Boston, they were known as the Beaneaters, the Doves, the Rustlers and the Bees.  During the 20th century until their move to Milwaukee, they played their home games primarily at two home ball parks – South End Grounds until 1914, and Braves Field from 1915 through 1952.  They also played some home games at Fenway Park in 1914 and 1915, including Opening Day of 1915.  Their home ball park in Milwaukee was County Stadium. The first game of the new baseball season for a team is played on Opening Day, and being named the Opening Day starter is an honor, which is often given to the player who is expected to lead the pitching staff that season, though there are various strategic reasons why a team's best pitcher might not start on Opening Day.

The Braves used 40 different Opening Day starting pitchers in their 80 National League seasons they played prior to moving to Atlanta. The Braves won 46 of those games against 42 losses in those Opening Day starts.  They also played two tie games.

Warren Spahn had the most Opening Day starts for the Boston and Milwaukee Braves with ten between 1952 and 1964.  Kid Nichols made six Opening Day starts between 1893 and 1901.  Jim Whitney (1881–1885) and John Clarkson (1888–1892) each had five Opening Day starts.  Tommy Bond (1877–1880), Vic Willis (1900–1904), Dick Rudolph (1915–1917, 1919), Al Javery (1942–1945) and Johnny Sain (1946–1949) each made four Opening Day starts.  Irv Young (1906–1908), Bob Smith (1927–1929) and Ed Brandt (1932, 1934, 1935) each had three such starts.  Other pitchers with multiple Opening Day starts for the Boston and Milwaukee Braves were Charles Radbourn, Jack Stivetts, Hub Perdue, Joe Oeschger, Joe Genewich, Danny MacFayden and Lew Burdette.

Prior to moving to Atlanta, the Braves played in the World Series four times.  The played in the World Series as the Boston Braves in 1914 and 1948, and as the Milwaukee Braves in 1957 and 1958.  They won the World Series in 1914 and 1957.  Their Opening Day starting pitchers in World Series years were Lefty Tyler in 1914, Sain in 1948, and Spahn in 1957 and 1958.  They lost their Opening Day game in 1914, 1948 and 1958, and won in 1957.  In addition, the franchise won the National League championship eight times during the 19th century, prior to the existence of the modern World Series.  Nichols was the team's Opening Day starting pitcher in three of those season, Clarkson and Bond in two of those seasons each, and Whitney was the Opening Day starting pitcher in one such season.

Jesse Barnes made an Opening Day start for the Braves against the New York Giants in 1925, after having made an Opening Day start for the Giants against the Braves in 1920.  Spahn is the only pitcher to make an Opening Day start for both the Boston Braves and the Milwaukee Braves.  Tony Cloninger, who made the last Opening Day start for the Milwaukee Braves in 1965 and the first for the Atlanta Braves in 1966, is the only pitcher to make an Opening Day start for both the Milwaukee and Atlanta Braves.

Key

Pitchers

References

Lists of Major League Baseball Opening Day starting pitchers
Boston Braves (baseball)
Milwaukee Braves